was a town located in Kitasaitama District, Saitama, Japan.

As of 2003, the town has an estimated population of 7,909 and a density of 477.02 persons per km2. The total area is 16.58 km2.

On October 1, 2005, Kawasato, along with the town of Fukiage (from Kitaadachi District), was merged into the expanded city of Kōnosu.

Dissolved municipalities of Saitama Prefecture
Kōnosu